The following is a list of My Super Sweet 16 episodes:

Series overview

Episodes

Season 1 (2005)

Season 2 (2005)

Season 3 (2006)

Season 4 (2007)

Season 5 (2007)

Season 6 (2007–08)

Season 7 (2008)

Season 8 (2008-15)

Season 9 (2009–11)

Season 10 (2017)

References

Lists of American non-fiction television series episodes
Lists of American reality television series episodes